Zhabinka District is a district (raion) of Brest Region, in Belarus. Its administrative center is Zhabinka. Administratively, the district is divided into 7 rural councils. It is the smallest district in the country by area.

History
Zhabinka District was formed on January 15, 1940. However, on August 8, 1959, it was disbanded and restored again on July 30, 1966.

Geography
The northern part of the district is low-plain (altitude up to 200 m above sea level), the central and southern parts are Brest Polesia (about 150 m). The lands are mainly sod-podzolic, sandy and sandy loam.

The river Mukhavets flows through the district.

Demographics
In 2014 the population of Zhabinka District was 24,469. Of these, 88.6% were of Belarusian, 5.5% Russian, 4.3% Ukrainian and 1.0% Polish ethnicity. 53.2% spoke Belarusian and 43.6% Russian as their native language.

 
Districts of Brest Region